Mutley or Muttley can refer to:

 Young Mutley (born 1976), British boxer and former British welterweight champion
 Mutley railway station, a former railway station in Plymouth, UK
 Muttley, a cartoon character created by Hanna-Barbera

See also
 Mutley Plain, a street and surrounding area in Plymouth